Zonghebaoshuiqu ( is a metro station of Zhengzhou Metro Chengjiao line. The station is close to the Zhengzhou Xinzheng Comprehensive Free Trade Zone.

Station layout 
The 2-level underground station has a single island platform. The station concourse is on the B1 level and the B2 level is for the platforms.

Since there is no crossover at Xinzheng International Airport station, trains of Chengjiao line traveling in both directions share the same platform at the station.

Exits

References 

Stations of Zhengzhou Metro
Chengjiao line, Zhengzhou Metro
Railway stations in China opened in 2017